Ijoid is a proposed but undemonstrated group of languages linking the Ijaw languages (Ịjọ) with the endangered Defaka language. The similarities, however, may be due to Ijaw influence on Defaka.

The Ijoid languages, or perhaps just Ijaw, are proposed to form a divergent branch of the hypothetical Niger–Congo family and are noted for their subject–object–verb basic word order, which is otherwise an unusual feature in Niger–Congo, shared only by such distant branches as Mande and Dogon. Like Mande and Dogon, Ijoid lacks even traces of the noun class system considered characteristic of Niger–Congo, and so might have split early from that family. Linguists Gerrit Dimmendaal and Tom Güldemann doubt its inclusion in Niger–Congo altogether and consider the Ijaw/Ijoid languages to be an independent family.

Comparative vocabulary
Sample basic vocabulary for Proto-Ijaw, Kalabari, and Defaka:

Numerals
Comparison of numerals in individual languages:

Bibliography
Jenewari, Charles E. W. (1989) 'Ijoid'. In Bendor-Samuel, John and Hartell, Rhonda L. (eds.), The Niger–Congo languages: A classification and description of Africa's largest language family, 105-118. Lanham, MD: University Press of America.
Williamson, Kay.  1969.  'Igbo' and 'Ịjọ', chapters 7 and 8 in: Twelve Nigerian Languages, ed. by E. Dunstan.  Longmans.
Williamson, Kay.  1971.  The Benue–Congo languages and Ịjọ.  In: Current Trends in Linguistics, Vol. 7, series ed. by T. A. Sebeok, 245-306.
Williamson, Kay.  1988.  Linguistic evidence for the prehistory of the Niger Delta.  In: The Prehistory of the Niger Delta, ed.  by E.J. Alagoa and others.  Hamburg: Helmut Buske Verlag.
Williamson, Kay.  1998.  Defaka revisited.  The multi-disciplinary approach to African history, edited by Nkparom C. Ejituwu, Chapter 9, 151-183.  Port Harcourt: University of Port Harcourt Press.
Williamson, Kay.  2004.  The language situation in the Niger Delta.  Chapter 2 in: The development of Ịzọn language, edited by Martha L. Akpana, 9-13.
Williamson, Kay & Blench, Roger (2000) 'Niger–Congo', in Heine, Bernd and Nurse, Derek (eds) African Languages: An Introduction. Cambridge: Cambridge University press, pp. 11–42.

References

External links
Ijoid materials (Roger Blench)

 
Niger–Congo languages
Language families